Ćukovac is a village in the municipality of Prokuplje, Serbia. At the 2002 census, it had a population of 360.

References

Populated places in Toplica District